Todd Walker may refer to:

 Todd Walker (born 1973), American former professional baseball player
 Todd Walker (cricketer) (born 1998), South African cricketer
 Todd Walker (photographer) (1917–1998), American photographer, printmaker and creator of artists' books

See also  
 archimania, a collective of architects and designers in Memphis, Tennessee, founded by Todd Walker and Barry Alan Yoakum
 Stephen Todd Walker (born 1966), American finance expert and author